Main Street After Dark is a 1945 American drama film directed by Edward L. Cahn and written by John C. Higgins and Karl Kamb. The film stars Edward Arnold, Selena Royle, Tom Trout, Audrey Totter, Dan Duryea, Hume Cronyn and Dorothy Morris. The film was released on January 12, 1945, by Metro-Goldwyn-Mayer.

Plot
Lt. Lorrigan has his hands full with the Dibson criminal family. Ma Dibson's thieving son Lefty is about to get out of prison. Her daughter Rosalie and Lefty's wife Jessie Belle pick up military servicemen in bars and steal from them.

Lorrigan keeps an eye on all. He frisks Lefty's brother Posey, warning the Dibsons to keep out of trouble. Lefty immediately plans to rob McBain, owner of the bar where Rosalie and Jessie Belle fleece the servicemen.

Using guns from pawnbroker Keller, expressly against Ma's wishes, Lefty falls into Lt. Lorrigan's trap, with undercover cops disguised as soldiers. In the struggle, Posey is accidentally shot. Lefty, Ma and the girls are all placed under arrest.

Cast
Edward Arnold as Lt. Lorrigan
Selena Royle as 'Ma' Abby Dibson
Tom Trout as Lefty Dibson
Audrey Totter as Jessie Belle Dibson
Dan Duryea as Posey Dibson
Hume Cronyn as Keller
Dorothy Morris as Rosalie Dibson

References

External links

1945 films
1940s English-language films
American drama films
1945 drama films
Metro-Goldwyn-Mayer films
Films directed by Edward L. Cahn
American black-and-white films
1940s American films